Jean Blaquière, a Pentecostal pastor, was a candidate for the Christian Heritage Party of Canada in the Canadian federal election of 1993, and won the party leadership in March 1994 at a Vancouver convention, in a race with two other contenders.

Blaquière chose to step down at the next convention in November 1995 in London, Ontario, and was succeeded by Ron Gray.

Electoral record

References

Christian Heritage Party of Canada leaders
Canadian Pentecostal pastors
Year of birth missing (living people)
Living people